are a  told about in Kōyama, Kimotsuki District, Kagosima Prefecture (now Kimotsuki).

Summary

They are said to wrap around people's necks and cover people's faces and suffocate people to death, and in other tales it is said that wrapped cloths would spin around and around and quickly come flying, wrap around people's bodies, and take them away to the skies.

There is a story where one man hurrying to his home at night when a white cloth came and wrapped around his neck, and when he cut it with his  (short sword), the cloth disappeared, and remaining on his hands was some blood.

In regions where they are said to appear and disappear, there seemed to be a custom where children were warned that if they play too late, that " would come."

Recent sightings
According to a report from the yōkai researcher , in recent years there have been many eyewitness reports of flying cloth-shaped objects thought to be .

In Kagoshima Prefecture where this legend is told, white cloth-like objects flying in low altitude have been witnessed. In Fukuoka Prefecture, also in Kyushu, there have been reports of extremely speedy  flying alongside  trains witnessed by  passengers.

Outside Kyushu, there have been witness reports in Higashi-Kōenji Station and Ogikubo, Tokyo. In Higashi-Kōenji, a woman walking her dog witnessed a cloth flying in the skies and followed it for a while.

In Shizuoka Prefecture, elementary school kids were said to have seen a transparent sheet-like object flutter around, and the entire object was like a rectangle, but it became thin on one end, like a tail.

While filming , the actor Shirō Sano witnessed an  flying above, said to have a long white shape.

True identity

In fiction
There are no depictions of ittan momen in classical yōkai emaki, so these yōkai was once relatively unknown, but they have become more widely known since appearing in Mizuki Shigeru's manga GeGeGe no Kitarō. This manga depicted them as speaking a Kyushu dialect, having good-natured personalities, and having a unique look while flying, which raised their fame and popularity despite their original legend of attacking people. In Mizuki's depictions these yōkai are depicted as a cloth with two eyes and two arms, so now they are commonly perceived to be pieces of cloth with two eyes in yōkai depictions, but Mizuki's depictions are original inventions and the ones in actual legend and in the previous witness reports have no eyes or arms and are instead simply flying objects that resembled cloth. In Mizuki's birthplace, Sakaiminato, Tottori Prefecture, they ranked number 1 in the "First Yōkai Popularity Poll" held by the tourism association.

In Kamen Rider Hibiki they appeared as enemy characters and they were based on the original legend with some extra original twists on their appearance and personality.

In 2007, the local historian of Kagoshima Prefecture, Takenoi Satoshi, started creating kamishibai of ittan momen so that such legends that are gradually being forgotten can be remembered by the children.

In the 2020 anime adaptation of the In/Spectre ("Kyokō Suiri") novels, an ittan momen drawn in the Mizuki style, flies out from under the skirt of the female protagonist Kotoko.

Similar yōkai
The following are yōkai considered to be similar to ittan momen. The musasabi would through the air along forest streets at night and cling to people's faces in surprise, so it is theorized that they are thought to a yōkai like this.

Fusuma ("bedding")
A yōkai told to frequently appear and disappear on Sado Island in the Edo Period. It was a yōkai that looked like a large furoshiki, and they would come flying out of nowhere at roads at night and cover the heads of pedestrians. They cannot be cut with blades of any sharpness, but they can be bit apart with teeth that have been blackened at least once. It is said that because of this, there was a custom for males to blacken their teeth.

Futon kabuse (literally, "cover with futon")
Saku-shima, Aichi Prefecture. In the writings of the folkloricist Kunio Yanagita, it is only written that "they'd float along and flying in with a whoosh, covering and suffocating to death," so there are not many legends about it and not much is known, but it is interpreted to be a futon-shaped object that come flying in and covering people's faces and suffocating them to death.

In popular culture
 In the anime/manga series Inu x Boku SS, one of the characters, Renshō Sorinozuka, is an Ittan-momen.
 In the tokusatsu franchise Super Sentai, the Ittan-momen was seen as a basis of a monster in series installments themed after Japanese culture:
 In Kakuranger (1994), one of the Youkai Army Corps members the Kakurangers fought was an Ittan-momen. It appeared in the Mighty Morphin Power Rangers toyline as "Calcifire".
 In Shinkenger (2009), one of the Ayakashi, named Urawadachi, served as the basis of the Ittan-momen within the series. He was not adapted into Power Rangers Samurai.
 In Ninninger (2015), one of the Youkai the Ninningers fought was an Ittan-momen, with elements borrowed from a carpet and a magician. It was later adapted into Power Rangers Ninja Steel as Abrakadanger who appears in his self-titled episode.
 In The Legend of Korra in the Avatar series, the two waring spirits, Raava and Vaatu that are based on Yin and Yang, may have had their designs inspired from Ittan-momen.
 In Yo-kai Watch, the Ittan-momen appears as a cloth-strip Yo-kai and is called So-Sorree in the English dub. Anyone inspirited by So-Sorree can become mischievous and then give insincere apologies. So-Sorree can evolve into Bowminos (a domino-shaped Yo-kai who makes anyone it inspirits give sincere apologies) and can be fused with Merican Flower to become Ittan-Sorry.
 In GeGeGe no Kitarō, a recurring yōkai character named Ittan Momen (Rollo Cloth in English translations) appears as an anthropomorphic cloth with the ability to fly. He is among Kitaro's core group of friends.

Notes

References

Further reading
 

Tsukumogami
Textiles in folklore